Gnevny was the lead ship of her class (officially known as Project 7) of 29 destroyers built for the Soviet Navy during the late 1930s. Completed in 1938, she was assigned to the Baltic Fleet and played a minor role in the 1939–1940 Winter War when the Soviet Union invaded Finland. A few days after the start of the German invasion of the Soviet Union (Operation Barbarossa) in June 1941, the ship struck a German mine and was badly damaged. After taking off the survivors, the Soviets failed to sink Gnevny with gunfire before they withdrew and the abandoned wreck drifted until she was sunk by German bombers three days later.

Design and description
Having decided to build the large and expensive   destroyer leaders, the Soviet Navy sought Italian assistance in designing smaller and cheaper destroyers.

Their crew numbered 197 officers and sailors in peacetime and 236 in wartime. The designers had been conservative in rating the turbines and many, but not all, of the ships handily exceeded their designed speed during their sea trials. Others fell considerably short of it. Gnevny reached  from  during her trials.

As built, the Gnevny-class ships mounted four  B-13 guns in two pairs of superfiring single mounts fore and aft of the superstructure. Anti-aircraft defense was provided by a pair of  34-K AA guns in single mounts and a pair of  21-K AA guns as well as two  DK or DShK machine guns. They carried six  torpedo tubes in two rotating triple mounts amidships; each tube was provided with a reload. The ships could also carry a maximum of either 60 or 95 mines and 25 depth charges. The ships were equipped with two K-1 paravanes intended to destroy mines and a pair of depth-charge throwers.

Construction and service 
Built in Leningrad's Shipyard No. 190 (Zhdanov) with the yard number 501, Gnevny was laid down on 8 December 1935, launched on 13 July 1936, and entered service with the Baltic Fleet on 23 December 1938. She bombarded Finnish fortifications on Utö in Åland on 14 December 1939 during the Winter War. Her crew, ordered to abandon ship after the commander of the force received a report of periscopes, was taken aboard Gordy. The accompanying ships unsuccessfully attempted to sink Gnevny with gunfire. Two days later, the abandoned hulk was spotted by three German Junkers Ju 88 bombers, who bombed and sank her. The destroyer was removed from the Navy List on 27 July.

Citations

Sources

Further reading

 

Gnevny-class destroyers
1936 ships
Ships built at Severnaya Verf
Ships sunk by German aircraft
Destroyers sunk by aircraft